Lalgudi railway station is a small railway station in Tiruchirappalli district, Tamil Nadu. Its code is LLI. It serves Lalgudi town. The station consists of two platforms. The platforms are not well sheltered. It lacks many facilities including water and sanitation.

References 

Railway stations in Tiruchirappalli